The Bruce is a 1996 medieval historical film set in Scotland and England. The film focuses primarily on the rise to power of Robert I of Scotland, culminating in the Battle of Bannockburn in AD 1314.

This film was directed by Bob Carruthers and David McWhinnie. Parts of the film were shot at Craigmillar Castle in Edinburgh and at Peebles in the Scottish Borders.

Cast
Sandy Welch as Robert I of Scotland
Oliver Reed as Robert Wishart
Brian Blessed as Edward I of England
 Richard Brindlecombe as Edward II of England
Pavel Douglas as John III Comyn, Lord of Badenoch
Hildegarde Neil as Eleanor of Castile
Michael Van Wijk as Henry de Bohun
Dee Hepburn as Mary Bruce
Ronnie Browne as Maxwell
Barrie Ingham as Gloucester
Jake D'Arcy as Chief MacKenzie

See also
 List of historical drama films
 Wars of Scottish Independence

References

External links
 

1996 films
War films based on actual events
Films set in the 14th century
Films set in Scotland
Films set in England
British biographical films
Films shot in Edinburgh
Films shot in the Scottish Borders
British war drama films
Robert the Bruce
Cultural depictions of Edward I of England
1990s English-language films
1990s British films